The 1983 Ballon d'Or, given to the best football player in Europe as judged by a panel of sports journalists from UEFA member countries, was awarded to Michel Platini on 27 December 1983.

Platini was the second French national to win the award after Raymond Kopa (in 1958), and the third player from Juventus after Omar Sívori and Paolo Rossi (in 1961 and 1982, respectively).

Rankings

References

External links
 France Football Official Ballon d'Or page

1983
1983–84 in European football